EQ1 or variation, may refer to:

 EverQuest 1, an MMO-RPG released in 1999
 The Equalizer 1, a 2014 action film
 Sky-Watcher EQ1, a telescope equatorial mount
 Chery eQ1, an electric car

See also

 EQL (disambiguation)
 EQ (disambiguation)
 Q1 (disambiguation)
 E1 (disambiguation)
 1 (disambiguation)